Émilie Loit and Anne-Gaëlle Sidot won in the final 1–6, 6–2, 6–0 against Kimberly Po and Nathalie Tauziat.

Seeds
Champion seeds are indicated in bold text while text in italics indicates the round in which those seeds were eliminated.

 Kimberly Po /  Nathalie Tauziat (final)
 Émilie Loit /  Anne-Gaëlle Sidot (champions)
 Patty Schnyder /  Magüi Serna (first round)
 Karina Habšudová /  Sonya Jeyaseelan (semifinals)

Draw

References
 2001 Internationaux de Tennis Feminin Nice Doubles Draw

Internationaux de Tennis Feminin Nice
2001 WTA Tour